Krzesin may refer to the following places in Poland:
Krzesin, Łódź Voivodeship (central Poland)
Krzesin, Lubusz Voivodeship (west Poland)
Krzesin Landscape Park, a protected area in Lubusz Voivodeship